This is a list of episodes for the anime series Hikaru no Go. This lists every episode, starting with the English title as they aired on Toonami Jetstream, followed by the title that was used on the original Japanese episode on TV Tokyo. The anime more or less follows the same storyline as the manga. A short summary follows, introducing the episode and referring to some of the gags. There are a total of 75 episodes, excluding a 2004 special showing what happens after episode 75. The final three episodes were released in English dub February 2011 when the series was put up for download on the iTunes store.

Episode list

New Year Special – The Road to the Hokuto Cup
Japanese Broadcast: 2004-01-03
Running time: 77 minutes
Ending Theme:
"Everlasting Snow" by Dream

Hikaru is given a phone call asking him to appear in a Japan/China/Korea under-18 tournament – the Hokuto Cup – but he finds out he will have to take part in a preliminary tournament to choose Japan's three contestants. Upon discussing this with Akira, he discovers that Akira has already been chosen for the tournament and will not be taking place in the preliminaries. Hikaru then decides not to visit Akira's Go Salon until he takes his place on the team with Akira. That may be tougher than originally planned, as not only does Hikaru have to battle with old friends for one of two coveted spots, but he may have a new challenger, in an unorthodox player from the Kansai Go Institute named Yashiro. The anime also shows Akira Toya play Ogata and Hikaru play Morishita 9-dan; both young players lose to the seasoned top pros.

This special does not cover the actual tournament. The manga, however, does and offers some closure.

 Game based on (Kadowaki): Imamura Toshiya vs. Naoto Hikosaka (1999)
 Game based on (Morishita): Cho Chikun vs. Lee Chang-ho (1993)
 Game based on (Ogata): Sakakibara Shoji vs. Sonoda Yuichi (1992)
 Game based on (Yashiro): Shinji Takao vs. Keigo Yamashita (2000)

Music

References

External links

  
  
 

Lists of anime episodes